Cinnamon Life Integrated Resort is the first integrated resort in Sri Lanka and the largest private investment in the country. Sri Lankan-British architect, Cecil Balmond designed the resort while Hyundai Engineering & Construction is the main contractor. The construction of the resort began in 2014. All the buildings in the resort topped off in May 2019. Even though the resort was originally planned to be completed by 2018, the project got delayed several times due to various reasons. John Keells started handing over keys to the suites apartments in August 2021. With handing over of residential and commercial units, revenue recognition started at Cinnamon Life. The remainder of the project is scheduled to be launched in a phased manner, in the first half of 2023.

History

2014-18

Cecil Balmond is the architect of the project while Hyundai Engineering & Construction is the main contractor. Waterfront Properties (Pvt) Ltd, a subsidiary of John Keells Holdings, will manage the property which will be of  total floor area. Construction of Cinnamon Life began in 2014 and the 'Suites Tower' topped off in December 2018. Over 50 percent of the floor area of the first residential tower is already sold by September 2016.

2019-Present
65% of the residential tower's floor area including six penthouses out of 25 are presold by March 2019. A quarter of buyers are expatriates while 7%-8% are foreign investors. Starting price of an apartment was US$400,000. All buildings including the Cinnamon Life Integrated Resort topped off in May 2019. The project was scheduled to finish in 2018 but the expected completion was delayed to March 2020 for Office Tower while it would be the first quarter of 2023 for the hotel and retail mall. The cost of the project has also risen due to the depreciation of the Sri Lankan rupee against the US dollar. The revenue expected from the residential apartment and commercial office space is US$250 million. The construction stopped in March 2020 due to the outbreak of the COVID-19 pandemic but resumed in May 2020 with keeping up with health guidelines imposed by the health authorities. Prime minister Mahinda Rajapaksa paid a brief impromptu visit to the site in October 2020.

Daily Mirror reported that Cinnamon Life Integrated Resort might get licenses from the government to operate casinos within the resort. On the dawn of the new year, 2021 resort's residential tower lightened up to read "2021 Hope". In February 2021, the resort's office and suites towers received the certificate of conformity and were scheduled to hand over to the occupants in March 2021. John Keells Properties started handing over the keys to the suites apartments in August 2021. The apartment tower consists of 196 units with two-four bedrooms. Revenue recognition at Cinnamon Life commenced after the handing over of residential and commercial units. The remainder of the project is planned to be launched in a phased manner, in the first half of 2023.

Resort
US$850 million investment will be the largest private investment in Sri Lanka and the resort will also include 427 apartments. The hotel consists of 800 rooms and twenty restaurants and bars including six specialty restaurants. A five-storeyed shopping mall will connect to the hotel and the resort is expected to be a hub for MICE (Meetings, incentives, conferencing, exhibitions).

Source: johnkeellsproperties.com

See also
 List of hotels in Sri Lanka

References

External links
 , Official website

2021 establishments in Sri Lanka
Tourist attractions in Sri Lanka
Landmarks in Sri Lanka
Hotels in Colombo
Resorts in Sri Lanka
Convention centres in Sri Lanka
Shopping malls in Sri Lanka